was a Japanese waka poet of the late-Heian period. One of her poems was included in the Ogura Hyakunin Isshu, and thirty-five in imperial collections. She also produced a private waka collection, the Suō no Naishi-shū.

Biography 

In 1108, she took ordination as a Buddhist nun due to illness.

The date of her death is unknown, but she probably died around 1110.

Poetry 
Thirty-five of her poems were included in imperial anthologies from the Goshūi Wakashū on.

The following poem by her was included as No. 67 in Fujiwara no Teika's Ogura Hyakunin Isshu:

References

Bibliography 
McMillan, Peter. 2010 (1st ed. 2008). One Hundred Poets, One Poem Each. New York: Columbia University Press.
Suzuki Hideo, Yamaguchi Shin'ichi, Yoda Yasushi. 2009 (1st ed. 1997). Genshoku: Ogura Hyakunin Isshu. Tokyo: Bun'eidō.

External links 
List of Suō no Naishi's poems in the International Research Center for Japanese Studies's online waka database.
Suō no Naishi on Kotobank.

11th century in Japan
11th-century Japanese poets
12th century in Japan
12th-century Japanese poets
People of Heian-period Japan
Heian period Buddhist nuns
Taira clan
Japanese women poets
Articles containing Japanese poems
Hyakunin Isshu poets